Chick's Deli is a delicatessen founded in 1957 in Cherry Hill, New Jersey, which sells various sandwiches. The deli is known for its hoagies and cheesesteaks.

History
Chick's was founded in 1957 on Township Lane in Cherry Hill, New Jersey across from the Erlton Fire Co. by Frank DeGregorio. The deli has remained in its current location.

Ratings
Chick's Deli has won numerous awards and praise for its sandwiches and is considered to have among the best chicken cheesesteaks and cheesesteaks in New Jersey.

In 2003, Chick's Deli was the winner for best cheesesteak in New Jersey and Philadelphia.

In 2009, food critic Peter Genovese considered Chick's cheesesteak number 13 of the top "20 Jersey Food Experiences You Must Try Before You Die".

See also

 List of delicatessens

References

External links 
 Chick's Deli on Yelp!

Cherry Hill, New Jersey
Restaurants in New Jersey
1957 establishments in New Jersey
Restaurants established in 1957
Delicatessens in the United States